Jesse Carter may refer to:

 Jesse Carter (Florida politician), in the 19th century
 Jesse F. Carter (1873–1943), Associate Justice of the South Carolina Supreme Court
 Jesse W. Carter (1888–1959), Associate Justice of the California Supreme Court
 Jesse Carter (boxer) (born 1958), twice defeated by Buster Drayton
 Jesse Benedict Carter (1872–1917), American classicist
 Jesse McI. Carter (1863–1930), U.S. Army general